The Daugava Stadions was a football stadium in the city of Daugavpils, Latvia.

References

Football venues in Latvia
FC Daugava